The 2001 Regal Welsh Open was a professional ranking snooker tournament that took place between 24 and 28 January 2001 at the Cardiff International Arena in Cardiff, Wales.

John Higgins was the defending champion, but he lost his quarter-final match against Stephen Lee.

Ken Doherty defeated Paul Hunter 9–2 in the final to win his fourth ranking title.

Tournament summary 

Defending champion John Higgins was the number 1 seed with World Champion Mark Williams seeded 2. The remaining places were allocated to players based on the world rankings.

Main draw

Final

References

Welsh Open (snooker)
2001 in snooker
2000s in Cardiff
Welsh